is a joint-use passenger railway station located in the city of Ebina, Kanagawa, Japan. It is jointly operated by the private railway company Odakyu Electric Railway and by the East Japan Railway Company (JR East). Odakyu manages the station premises.

Lines
Atsugi Station is served by the Sagami Line and the Odakyu Odawara Line.

Station layout
The Odakyu portion of station consists of two opposed side platforms with two tracks, connected to the station building by a footbridge. The JR portion of the station has a single side platform, serving one track.

Platforms

Odakyu

JR East

Station history
Despite being located in neighboring Ebina, the station was named  “Atsugi” to fulfill a pledge by the railway management to build a railroad  “to Atsugi”. The Sotetsu Railway (currently the JR Sagami Line) linked to the station on 15 July 1926. On 1 April 1927, the Odakyu Electric Railway built the adjacent . With the completion of Ebina Station on the Jinchū Railroad on 25 November 1941, operations to Atsugi were discontinued. Atsugi Station of newly nationalized Sagami Line and Kawaharaguchi Station were joined into the same station building on 1 June 1944. A new station building was opened on 31 July 1971. 

Station numbering was introduced in January 2014 with Atsugi being assigned station number OH33.

Passenger statistics
In fiscal 2019, the JR portion of the station was used by an average of 6,863 passengers daily (boarding passengers only). During the same period, the Odakyu station was used by an average of 20,287 passengers daily (total).

The passenger figures (boarding passengers only) for previous years are as shown below.

Surrounding area
The nearest railway station from US Naval Air Facility Atsugi is Sagami-Ōtsuka Station, not Atsugi Station.

See also
List of railway stations in Japan

References

External links

 Atsugi Station (Odakyū) 
 Atsugi Station (JR East) 

Railway stations in Japan opened in 1926
Odakyu Odawara Line
Sagami Line
Railway stations in Kanagawa Prefecture
Ebina, Kanagawa